Bohren or Bøhren is a surname. Notable people with the surname include: 

 Craig Bohren (born 1940), American atmospheric scientist and physicist
 Geir Bøhren (born 1951), Norwegian musician and composer
 Peter Bohren (1822-1882), Swiss mountain guide
 Raphaël Bohren (born 1984), Swiss figure skater
 Rudolf Bohren (1920-2010), Swiss Protestant (practical) theologian
 Sebastian Bohren (born 1987), Swiss violinist
 Spencer Bohren (born 1950), American musician, teacher and artist

See also 
 Bohren & der Club of Gore, German band
 Bohnen (disambiguation)
 Boren (disambiguation)